is a fictional character created by Kazuma Kamachi and first illustrated by Kiyotaka Haimura. She is a major character in the A Certain Magical Index light novel series and the main protagonist of its manga spin-off series A Certain Scientific Railgun.

She was created as a means to show the social hierarchy in the world, as well as how powerful the main character is.

She has been praised by both fans and critics alike for her personality and relationships with other characters of the series. Many pieces of merchandise have also been made using the character's likeness.

Creation and conception

According to Kamachi, Mikoto was created as "a way of showing the existence of a power class (hierarchy) in a way that is easy to understand". Specifically, Mikoto was designed so that despite the fact that she was a character with strong and versatile attack power abilities, she was still inferior to Toma Kamijo. He also added that he made her "easy to write in any scene, from serious to comedic".

At the design stage, Mikoto was originally planned to have long hair. There were also plans for her to "fire" her Railgun power with hair bundled as rails. However, it was scrapped because the long hairstyle was thought to be more synonymous with Index's character.

Characteristics and appearances

Mikoto is a middle-school student attending the eighth grade at Tokiwadai Middle School. She is ranked third of the seven level five (most powerful) espers in Academy City. She has the ability to use electricity in various ways, such as shooting it, using it to shoot other items as projectiles (hence her nickname railgun), and electromagnetism. As a child, she was tricked into giving up her DNA map, which allowed scientists to make 20,001 clones of her for experimental use.

In A Certain Magical Index
In the A Certain Magical Index series, she appears as a friend of Index's main protagonist Toma Kamijo. Toma often gets involved in her affairs and helps her get out of trouble multiple times, even stopping her from committing suicide once. Due to this, she develops tsundere-like feelings toward Toma. She also appears in the spin-off movie A Certain Magical Index: The Movie – The Miracle of Endymion, as well as the series' various spin-off novels and games.

In A Certain Scientific Railgun
In A Certain Scientific Railgun, she appears as the series' main protagonist. In this series, it focuses more on her relationship with Kuroko Shirai, Kazari Uiharu, and Ruiko Saten. However, it does eventually cross-over with the story of Index, which it retells from her perspective, thus giving new background to several of the events of that series. She also appears in its spin-off series A Certain Scientific Railgun: Astral Buddy, as well as the series' other various spin-off media.

Other appearances
Mikoto appears in Kamachi's one-volume crossover series . She also appears in the crossover video game Dengeki Bunko: Fighting Climax as a playable character.

Mikoto makes a cameo appearance in the eighth episode of the anime series Okami-san and Her Seven Companions. She was presented as a potential candidate to be married to the young millionaire Nezumi Chūtaro.

Reception

Popularity
In a 2010 poll asking people what fictional character they would name their potential child after, Mikoto was first on the list of female names.

Many products and other merchandise have been made depicting her, such as a computer, nendoroids, plush dolls, action figures, and soccer jerseys. A kick-able vending machine and special coins have also been made, both of which are based on actions the character performs in the series.

Accolades and critical reception
Mikoto was awarded best female character in the Kono Light Novel ga Sugoi! guidebook nine times in ten years, winning it more times than any other female character in the history of the publication. In the years she did not win, she ranked fifth in 2009, second in 2015, third in 2020, and seventh in 2021.

She has been given positive reviews by many critics. Theron Martin from Anime News Network praised her character and her relationships with other characters of the series, saying that it was entertaining to watch. Chris Beveridge from The Fandom Post also praised her character and her relationships with other characters. In their review of the first two light novel volumes, Matthew Warner from The Fandom Post criticized Mikoto, saying she had potential but was underdeveloped. However, in their review of the third volume, they praised Mikoto, saying that she got the attention she deserved.

Mikoto's involvement in the Index plot was also praised. Chris Beveridge from The Fandom Post said that he enjoyed watching Toma and Mikoto's relationship unfold, and that he "wanted them to get closer together". Theron Martin from Anime News Network also praised Mikoto's role in the series.

Mikoto's portrayals have also been praised by critics. In her review of A Certain Scientific Railgun S, Rebecca Silverman from Anime News Network praised both the original Japanese and the English dub, however, she gave special praise to Brittney Karbowski's portrayl of Mikoto, stating its worth listening to even to people who don't normally like dubs, and ultimately rating the dubbed version a higher score than the original Japanese version. Theron Martin from the same website also praised Karbowski's performance, saying it was "a good fit for [the character]."

Impact
Her nickname  was used as inspiration to create the name of the Chinese streaming website Bilibili. The website has also named some of its various features for her and other characters of the series and celebrates her birthday every year on May 2. The Chinese streaming website also owns an esports team named Hangzhou Spark, which was also named with inspiration from the character, as well as having its logos designed after her.

Notes

References

External links
Mikoto Misaka's page on the A Certain Magical Index season 1 and 2 official website 
Mikoto Misaka's page on the A Certain Magical Index season 3 official website 
Mikoto Misaka's page on the A Certain Scientific Railgun official website 
Mikoto Misaka's page on the A Certain Scientific Railgun S official website 
Mikoto Misaka's page on the A Certain Scientific Railgun T official website 
Mikoto Misaka's page on the official Square Enix website for the series 

A Certain Magical Index characters
Female characters in anime and manga
Fictional characters with electric or magnetic abilities
Fictional Japanese people in anime and manga
Fictional middle school students
Fictional ranged weapons practitioners
Literary characters introduced in 2004
Teenage characters in anime and manga
Teenage characters in television